Grisedale Tarn is a tarn in the Lake District of England between Fairfield and Dollywagon Pike.

It is the legendary resting place of the crown of the kingdom of Cumbria, after the crown was conveyed there in 945 by soldiers of the last king, Dunmail, after he was slain in battle with the combined forces of the English and Scottish kings.

It holds brown trout, perch and eels. The outflow is to Ullswater to the north-east, picking up all of the rainfall from the eastern face of Dollywagon Pike.

The Tarn is the subject of a poem by the Rev. Frederick William Faber printed in 1840.

See also

 Grizedale
 Grizedale Forest
 Brothers Parting Stone

References

Lakes of the Lake District
Patterdale